Henrietta Augusta Dugdale ( Worrell; 14 May 1827 – 17 June 1918) was a pioneer Australian who initiated the first female suffrage society in Australia.   Non-conformist, provocative and quick-witted, her campaigning resulted in breakthroughs for women's rights in Australia.

Life
Henrietta Augusta Worrell was born at St Pancras London on 14 May 1827, the second surviving daughter of John Worrell and Henrietta Ann (née Austin). Her claim of a first marriage at 14 does not fit with her official marriage in 1848 to a merchant navy officer J. A. Davies, with whom she came to Australia in 1852. After Davies' death she married ship's captain William Dugdale in Melbourne in March 1853. They settled at Queenscliff where sons Einnim, Carl and Austin were born. Dugdale was a vegetarian.

After separating from William Dugdale in the late 1860s, she moved to the Melbourne suburb of Camberwell where she remained until a few years before her death on 17 June 1918 at Point Lonsdale. Her third husband Frederick Johnson, whom she married in 1903, predeceased her.

Her campaign for 'equal justice for women' began with a letter to Melbourne's Argus newspaper in April 1869.  It peaked during the 1880s in radical public debate as a member of Melbourne's Eclectic Society and the Australasian Secular Association, through her utopian allegory A Few Hours in a Far-Off Age and in the formation in May 1884 of the Victorian Women's Suffrage Society, the first of its kind in Australia. That same year, Henrietta wrote a scathing judgement of the Victorian courts, and their inability to protect women from violent crimes. Published in the Melbourne Herald, her words cut straight to the core of the issue: 'Women's anger,' she wrote, 'was compounded by the fact that those who inflicted violence upon women had a share in making the laws while their victims did not.'

She was acknowledged as a suffrage pioneer when Australian women attained the vote and the associated right to stand for federal parliament in June 1902 (a world first) and when the State of Victoria belatedly followed suit in December 1908. Dugdale died on 17 June 1918 in Point Lonsdale, Australia.

Legacy
A street in the Canberra suburb of Cook is named for her.

In 2013, she was nationally recognised as a critical first-wave Australian feminist, and The Dugdale Trust for Women & Girls, is named in honour of her life's work. Dugdale was inducted into the Victorian Honour Roll of Women in 2001. The Dugdale Trust for Women & Girls is a national harm-prevention institution for which The Victorian Women's Trust operates as trustee.

See also
List of suffragists and suffragettes
List of women's rights activists
Women and government in Australia
Politics of Australia
Human Rights in Australia
Suffrage in Australia
Women's suffrage in Australia
Timeline of women's suffrage

References

Further reading

External links

Australian Dictionary of Biography
Australian Women's History Forum 
Museum of Australian Democracy at Old Parliament House 
Utopia Girls – How Women won the Vote. Website for ABC TV production about women's suffrage

1827 births
1918 deaths
19th-century Australian people
19th-century Australian women
20th-century Australian women
Australian suffragists
Australian vegetarianism activists
Australian women's rights activists
English emigrants to Australia
People from London